Tetranodus tropipennis is a species of beetle in the family Cerambycidae. It was described by Chemsak in 1977.

References

Tillomorphini
Beetles described in 1977